Siege of Riga may refer to:
Siege of Riga (1656)
Siege of Riga (1700)
Siege of Riga (1710), culminating in the Capitulation of Estonia and Livonia
Siege of Riga (1812)